State Road 43 in the U.S. State of Indiana is split into two segments.

Route description

Southern section
This winding, two-lane section of State Road 43 connects Indiana State Road 46 in Owen County near McCormick's Creek State Park with Indiana State Road 54 in eastern Greene County.

Northern section
The northern portion of State Road 43 begins at I–65 near Battle Ground in Tippecanoe County. Going north, it passes through Brookston and Chalmers before terminating at US 24 and US 421 in Reynolds in White County.

History
SR 43 used to connect Michigan City and Solsberry. It followed SR 46 through Spencer, US 231 from Spencer to West Lafayette, and US 421 from Reynolds to Michigan City, along with its split sections.

The early 1950s renumbering of Indiana highways caused SR 43 to be concurrent. US 421 was extended into Indiana in 1951, and US 231 was commissioned in 1952. SR 43 was concurrent with US 421 until the northern terminus was truncated to Reynolds in 1955 in favor of US 421. A large portion of SR 43 from Lafayette to Spencer was eliminated in 1981 in favor of US 231.

In Lafayette, SR 43 basically followed the old routing of US 231 for most of the way. The route followed old US 231, 4th Street (after Alabama Street, it was 4th Street northbound and 3rd Street southbound), the Union Street bridge over the Wabash River, and River road after an interchange.

Major intersections

References

External links

Indiana Highway Ends: State Road 43

043
Transportation in Greene County, Indiana
Transportation in Monroe County, Indiana
Transportation in Owen County, Indiana
Transportation in Tippecanoe County, Indiana
Transportation in White County, Indiana